Leytenant Zatsarenny was an Imperial Russian Navy destroyer of the four-strong  (named after Ivan Shestakov (1820–1888)).

Leytenant Zatsarenny herself was named after a torpedo boat captain who had distinguished himself in the Russo-Turkish War of 1877–1878.

She was sunk on 30 June 1917, when she ran onto a German naval mine that had been laid only days before by the Ottoman Navy light cruiser Midilli (formerly the Imperial German Navy′s ). Midilli had laid seventy mines off the mouth of the Danube, followed by another ten off Fidonisi Island, which to the Germans was then known as Schlangen Insel (Snake Island), off Sulina.

Leytenant Zatsarenny was rediscovered in July 2007 by Russian divers.

Design and construction
The  was developed to meet a requirement for larger destroyers for the Black Sea Fleet based on experience of the Russo-Japanese War. Two funnels were fitted.

The ship was originally designed to have a gun armament of six 75 mm guns, but was completed with the forward gun replaced by a single 120 mm (4.7 in gun). Three 450 mm (17.7 in) torpedo tubes were fitted, while 40 mines could be carried. After 1909, another 75 mm gun was replaced by a 120 mm gun, while after 1914, the remaining 75 mm guns were replaced by two 47 mm anti-aircraft guns and the mine load increased to 50. The ship had a crew of 91–94.

Leytenant Zatsarenny was laid down at the Naval Yard, Nikolayev (now Mykolaiv), Ukraine, on 3 September 1906 Old Style (OS) (16 September New Style (NS)), and was launched on 16 October 1907 OS, entering service on 3 October 1909 (OS).

Service
Leytenant Zatsarenny remained part of the Black Sea fleet during the First World War, although the low speed of the Leytenant Shestakovs limited their usefulness. Operations included escort operations, support for fleet operations, minelaying, landing sabotage teams and bombarding Turkish fortifications and ports. On 1–6 January 1915 (OS) Leytenant Shestakov, along with other ships, took part in the destruction of the steamer   and three sailing ships off Sinop.

From January to April 1916, Leytenant Zatsarenny took part in the Trebizond Campaign, a Russian land and amphibious offensive that resulted in the capture of the Turkish cite of Trabzon. On 2 November (NS) (20 October (OS)) that year, Leytenant Zatsarenny, along with sister ship  and the destroyer , carried out a raid against Turkish coastal craft hidden at the mouth of the Terme River, with 20 Turkish barges and sailing craft being captured or destroyed.

Leytenant Zatsarenny was sunk on 17 June 1917 (OS) (30 June NS), when she ran onto a German naval mine that had been laid only days before by the Ottoman Navy light cruiser Midilli (formerly the Imperial German Navy′s ). Midilli had laid seventy mines off the mouth of the Danube, followed by another ten off Fidonisi Island, which to the Germans was then known as Schlangen Insel (Snake Island), off Sulina.

References

Bibliography
 
 
 

 
 

Ships of the Imperial Russian Navy
Leytenant Shestakov-class destroyers
1907 ships
Maritime incidents in 1917
World War I shipwrecks in the Black Sea
Ships sunk by mines